Francis Patrick McElhone  (5 April 1929 – 22 September 1982) was a Scottish Labour Party politician.

McElhone was elected Member of Parliament (MP) for Glasgow Gorbals in a 1969 by-election. He served until the constituency was abolished in boundary changes for the February 1974 general election.

He was then elected as MP for Glasgow Queen's Park, and held that seat until his death from a heart attack on 22 September 1982, aged 53, shortly after participating in a march and demonstration in support of National Health Service workers in Glasgow. He served as Parliamentary Under-Secretary of State for Scotland from 1975 to 1979.

After his death, his widow, Helen McElhone, was elected to represent Glasgow Queen's Park. She only served for a few months before the seat was abolished by boundary changes. Their son is the musician Johnny McElhone.

References 

Times Guide to the House of Commons, 1979

1929 births
1982 deaths
Gorbals
Scottish Labour MPs
Members of the Parliament of the United Kingdom for Glasgow constituencies
UK MPs 1966–1970
UK MPs 1970–1974
UK MPs 1974
UK MPs 1974–1979
UK MPs 1979–1983